The First Transnistrian or First Pridnestrovian, also known as TV PMR, is a public television channel from Transnistria, an unrecognized republic officially part of Moldova. It began broadcasting on 9 August 1992 and is available in the Romanian, Russian and Ukrainian languages. It was established by the Government of Transnistria and the Supreme Council to replace Moldovan media that allegedly widespreaded "distorted facts" and "blocked the transmission of reliable information about events in the region".

References

External links
Official website 

Television channels and stations established in 1992
Mass media in Transnistria
Publicly funded broadcasters
Romanian-language television stations
Russian-language television stations
Ukrainian-language television stations